Raphitoma gougeroti is an extinct species of sea snail, a marine gastropod mollusc in the family Raphitomidae.

It was renamed as Raphitoma gougeroti by J. Tucker & Le Renard in 1993

Description

Distribution
Fossils of this extinct marine species were found in Eocene strata in the Paris Basin, France.

References
Citations

Bibliography
 Cossmann (M.), 1889 Catalogue illustré des coquilles fossiles de l'Éocène des environs de Paris (4ème fascicule). Annales de la Société royale Malacologique de Belgique, t. 24, p. 3-385
 Cossmann (M.), 1896 Essais de Paléoconchologie comparée (2ème livraison), p. 1-179 
 Cossmann (M.) & Pissarro (G.), 1913 Iconographie complète des coquilles fossiles de l'Éocène des environs de Paris, t. 2, p. pl. 46-65 
 Wenz (W.), 1943 Handbuch der Paläozoologie. Gastropoda, 6., p. 1201-1506 
 Powell (A.W.B.), 1966 The Molluscan families Speightiidae and Turridae. An evaluation of the valid taxa, both Recent and fossil, with lists of characteristic species. Bulletin of the Auckland Institute and Museum, n°5, p. 5-184
 Le Renard (J.) & Pacaud (J.-M.), 1995 Révision des Mollusques paléogènes du Bassin de Paris. 2 - Liste des références primaires des espèces. Cossmanniana, t. 3, vol. 3, p. 65-132

External links
 

gougeroti
Gastropods described in 1993